Pothuava is a subgenus of the genus Aechmea.

Species
Species accepted by Encyclopedia of Bromeliads as of October 2022:

Aechmea alopecurus 
Aechmea bocainensis 
Aechmea bruggeri 
Aechmea cathcartii 
Aechmea guarapariensis 
Aechmea lilacinantha 
Aechmea mariae-reginae 
Aechmea nudicaulis 
Aechmea ornata 
Aechmea pectinata 
Aechmea pineliana 
Aechmea roberto-anselmoi 
Aechmea roberto-seidelii 
Aechmea rubroaristata 
Aechmea squarrosa 
Aechmea triticina 
Aechmea vanhoutteana

References

Plant subgenera